The French Mistress is a comedy play by the British entertainer Sonnie Hale under the pen name Robert Munro about the arrival of a new young French teacher at a traditional public school.

It premiered at the Wimbledon Theatre in June 1955. Four years later it enjoyed a West End run of 185 performances, first at the Adelphi Theatre before transferring to the Prince's Theatre. The cast included Hugh Wakefield and Richard Bird.

Cast and Performance Locations
Performed at The Adelphi Theatre, Strand, London, 13 Jun 1959; presented by Jack Hylton; directed by Joan Riley; settings by Denis Wreford
Transferred to: The Prince's Theatre, London, closing performance, 21 Nov 1959; The Theatre Royal, Windsor, Apr 1959
Originally at: The Wimbledon Theatre, 20 Jun 1955; directed by Robert Monro
On tour: 1956: The Lyceum, Edinburgh

Casts: Sonnie Hale, Kathleen St John, John Law, Nigel Beard, Robin Lloyd, Juliet Winsor, Bruce Heighley, Kenneth Outwin, Olive Milbourne, Sydney King, Nicholas Stevenson, Gary Watson, Susan Maryott, Anthony Green, Richard Ives, Colin Wall, Christopher Sandford, Kenneth Laird, Richard Bird, Rosamond Burne, Peter Gray, Scot Finch, Michael Meacham, Marie-Claire Verlene, Pearson Dodd, Richard Fox, Peter Greenspan, David Lord, Hugh Wakefield

Adaptation
In 1960 it was turned into a film A French Mistress directed by Roy Boulting and starring Cecil Parker, Agnès Laurent, James Robertson Justice and Ian Bannen. (The same theme should be compared to Tamahine, 1963, by Denis Cannan).

References

Bibliography
 Goble, Alan. The Complete Index to Literary Sources in Film. Walter de Gruyter, 1999.
 Wearing, J.P. The London Stage 1950-1959: A Calendar of Productions, Performers, and Personnel.  Rowman & Littlefield, 2014.

1955 plays
Comedy plays
British plays adapted into films
West End plays